Renal medullary fibroma is a benign kidney tumour.  It is commonly an incidental finding.

Signs and symptoms
Renal medullary fibromas are typically asymptomatic.

Diagnosis
Renal medullary fibromas are diagnosed by pathologists based on the examination of tissue.

They consist of bland spindle-shaped or stellate-shaped cells in a loose stroma.  Renal tubules may be entrapped.

Treatment
Generally, no treatment is required.

See also
Kidney tumour
Kidney cancer

References

External links 

Benign renal neoplasms